Kavita is an Indian soap opera created by Ekta Kapoor and co-produced by Ekta Kapoor and Shobha Kapoor under their banner Balaji Telefilms. The series premiered in 2000 on Metro Gold and starred Ram Kapoor and Smriti Irani. Initially airing on Metro Gold, later on its closure, it was acquired and its airing was shifted to Star Plus.

Plot
The series revolves around Kavita  who is under various veiled attacks just because of her fight for truth and justice. Kavita belongs to middle class family. She is jobless and to fight the financial crises her family faces, Kavita joins a restaurant as a waitress. The series explores the love between Rishi and Kavita and how they fight the circumstances to stand tall for their love.

Cast 
 Ram Kapoor as Rishi Grover
 Smriti Irani as Kavita 
 Jayati Bhatia
 Maya Alagh
 Swati Chitnis
 Harsh Khurrana
 Gufi Paintal

References

External links 
 
 Official Website

Balaji Telefilms television series
2000 Indian television series debuts
2001 Indian television series endings
Metro Gold original programming
Indian television soap operas